Rod Michano, (born Toussaint Roderick Michano, April 19, 1964 in Thunder Bay, Ontario) is a noted Canadian First Nations HIV/AIDS activist and educator. He is a member of the Ojibways of the Pic River First Nation in Northern Ontario.

Michano left Pic River at age 18, travelling extensively throughout the United States and Canada before coming to Toronto, Ontario where he became active in many Aboriginal and LGBT community organizations. He began HIV/AIDS work and activism in 1990 and has since become a public speaker and educator. He has been involved in many grassroots initiatives that helped raise the profile of HIV/AIDS among Aboriginal, First Nations, Metis, and Inuit, and was featured in the 1997 documentary film Changing Faces of AIDS.

He resides in Toronto, Ontario, Canada, and was co-host of Toronto's 2007 AIDS Vigil.

References

1964 births
HIV/AIDS activists
Ojibwe people
First Nations activists
Canadian LGBT rights activists
Living people
People from Thunder Bay
Two-spirit people
LGBT First Nations people
20th-century First Nations people
21st-century First Nations people
21st-century Canadian LGBT people
20th-century Canadian LGBT people